Quách Thị Lan (born 18 October 1995) is a Vietnamese sprinter and hurdler who specialises in the 400 m distance. She won individual silver medals at the Southeast Asian Games (2013 and 2015), Asian Games (2014 and 2018) and Asian championships (2017).

Her elder brother Quách Công Lịch won three medals in the 400 m and 400 m hurdles events at the 2017 Southeast Asian Games.

References

External links
 

1995 births
Living people
Vietnamese female sprinters
Vietnamese female hurdlers
Asian Games medalists in athletics (track and field)
Athletes (track and field) at the 2014 Asian Games
Athletes (track and field) at the 2018 Asian Games
Asian Games gold medalists for Vietnam
Asian Games silver medalists for Vietnam
Asian Games bronze medalists for Vietnam
Medalists at the 2014 Asian Games
Medalists at the 2018 Asian Games
Southeast Asian Games medalists in athletics
Southeast Asian Games gold medalists for Vietnam
Southeast Asian Games silver medalists for Vietnam
Competitors at the 2013 Southeast Asian Games
Competitors at the 2015 Southeast Asian Games
Competitors at the 2017 Southeast Asian Games
Competitors at the 2019 Southeast Asian Games
Southeast Asian Games bronze medalists for Vietnam
Asian Athletics Championships winners
Asian Games gold medalists in athletics (track and field)
People from Thanh Hóa province
Athletes (track and field) at the 2020 Summer Olympics
Olympic athletes of Vietnam
21st-century Vietnamese women
Competitors at the 2021 Southeast Asian Games
20th-century Vietnamese women